Scotland is a country that is part of the United Kingdom that forms the northern third of the island of Great Britain in North-West Europe.

Scotland may also refer to:

Government in Scotland
 Kingdom of Scotland, a sovereign state from the 9th century to 1707
 Scotland (European Parliament constituency)

Other places

Australia
 Scotland Island, New South Wales

Canada
 Scotland, municipality in County of Brant

England
 Scotland, Lincolnshire, a hamlet adjacent to Ingoldsby
 Scotland Road, a road in Liverpool

United States
 Scotland, Arkansas
 Scotland, Connecticut
 Scotland, Florida
 Scotland, Georgia
 Scotland, Indiana
 Scotland, Maryland
 Scotland, Mississippi
 Scotland, Missouri
 Scotland, Pennsylvania
 Scotland, South Dakota
 Scotland, Texas
 Scotland, Virginia
 Scotland Neck, North Carolina
 Scotland Run, a river in the New Jersey, United States

People 
 Alexander Scotland, British Army and intelligence officer
 Egon Scotland, German journalist
 Jason Scotland, Trinidad and Tobago footballer
 Joe Scotland, Negro league baseball player
 Patricia Scotland, Baroness Scotland of Asthal, Labour Party life peer

Arts, entertainment, and media 
 "Scotland" (The Goodies), an episode of a British comedy television series 
  "Scotland" by the Lumineers, the opening theme of the TV series Reign
 BBC Scotland, division of the BBC, which is responsible for broadcasting in Scotland
 Scotland, PA, a 2002 film

Sports
 List of national sports teams of Scotland
 Scotland at the Commonwealth Games, a Commonwealth Games team
 Scottish cricket team
 Scotland national basketball team
 Scotland national football team
 Scotland national rugby league team
 Scotland national rugby union team

Other uses
 Bank of Scotland, a commercial and clearing bank based in Edinburgh

See also 
 Scotia
 Caledonia

 Scotland Yard

 Scotia (disambiguation)

 Caledonia (disambiguation)
 New Scotland (disambiguation)
 Scotland County (disambiguation)
 Scotland Township (disambiguation)